The Tongxin Great Mosque is a mosque in Tongxin County, Wuzhong City, Ningxia Hui Autonomous Region, China. The mosque is the oldest and largest mosque in Ningxia.

History
The mosque was likely built in the fourteenth century during the Yuan Dynasty. It was originally a Mongolian Buddhist temple that was eventually abandoned after the fall of the Yuan Dynasty in 1368. It was reconsecrated as a mosque during the early Ming dynasty. The mosque underwent major renovations in the sixteenth century, in 1791 and in 1907. The mosque was further expanded in 1936. When the Chinese Workers' and Peasants' Red Army went on a westward campaign in 1936 liberating areas in Ningxia, they held a meeting with the local people at the mosque. They also set up the Yuhai County People's Government in Shanganning. In 1983, it was recognized as the National Key Cultural Relics Protection Unit by the State Council. Today, the mosque is affiliated with the Yihewani sect.

Architecture
The mosque was built in Han style and decorated in Islamic style, which showcase the combination of Han and Hui culture. All of the buildings were built on a cyan platform, seven meters high. There is an imitation-timber work entrance wall, decorated with brick carvings, at the front gate. The main building, consisting of the main prayer hall and two connecting halls, accommodates 1,000 worshipers. Behind the mosque lies a cemetery which also contains the shrines of two Sufi saints (or Shaykhs).

Transportation
The mosque is accessible by bus from the Yinchuan Railway Station.

See also
 Weizhou Grand Mosque
 Taizi Great Mosque
 Islam in China
 List of mosques in China

References

Buildings and structures in Ningxia
Major National Historical and Cultural Sites in Ningxia
Ming dynasty architecture
Mosques in China
Wuzhong, Ningxia